Twenty-Four Preludes for Piano (Op. 41) is a set of 24 preludes composed by Russian emigre composer Lera Auerbach in 1999. The work alternates between major and minor, following the progression of relative minor starting from C major and concluding on D minor. The work was commissioned by Tom and Vivian Waldeck in collaboration with the Caramoor International Music Festival. The work is dedicated to Tom and Vivian Waldeck. The premiere was given on 23 July 1999 in New York and was first performed by the composer herself.  

The piece takes 39 minutes in a standard performance.

Form 
The long-range form follows the tonal progression of the relative minor, the descending minor-third key that is associated with every major key. Also, the work oscillates between major and minor throughout the work, while the tempo markings do not indicate any pattern and are instead tied to the individual key itself. 

 C major Moderato
 A minor Presto
 G major Moderato
 E minor Appassionato – Nostalgico
 D major Andantino sognante
 B minor Chorale
 A major Andante
 F sharp minor Presto
 E major Allegretto
 C sharp minor Largo
 B major Misterioso
 G sharp minor Allegro bruto
 F sharp major Andante
 E flat minor Allegretto
 D flat major Moderato
 B flat minor Allegro ma non troppo, tragico
 A flat major Adagio tragico
 F minor Grave
 E flat major Adagio religioso
 C minor Misterioso
 B flat major Allegro moderato
 G minor Andante
 F major Allegretto
 D minor Grandioso

Recordings 
 2004: Academy of Music, Lera Auerbach (piano)
 2015: Centaur Records, Inc., Eli Kalman (piano)

Further links 
 Score (Editions Sikorski/Exempla Nova)
 Performance Guide for 24 Preludes for Piano (Nezhdanova-Cunningham, 2017)

References 

Compositions by Lera Auerbach
1999 compositions
Contemporary classical compositions
Preludes (music)
Compositions covering all major and/or minor keys